Juncus homalocaulis is a species of flowering plant in the rush family, Juncaceae. A tufted, perennial plant growing from 5 cm to 35 cm tall, with stems 0.5 to 1.2 mm thick. Often found in Australia and New Zealand in moist grassland or woodland. The specific epithet is derived from Greek, meaning "even stem".

References

homalocaulis
Plants described in 1878
Flora of New South Wales
Flora of Victoria (Australia)
Flora of Queensland
Flora of South Australia
Flora of New Zealand